South Tyrol, officially the Autonomous Province of Bolzano, is an autonomous province in Northern Italy, one of the two that make up the autonomous region of Trentino-Alto Adige/Südtirol. Its capital and largest city is Bolzano (German: Bozen; Ladin: Balsan or Bulsan).

According to the 2011 census, 62.3% of the population uses German as their first language (Standard German in the written form and an Austro-Bavarian dialect in the spoken form); 23.4% of the population speaks Italian, mainly in and around the two largest cities (Bolzano, with an Italian-speaking majority, and Meran, with a slight majority German-speaking); 4.1% speaks Ladin, a Rhaeto-Romance language; 10.2% of the population (mainly recent immigrants) speaks another language natively. Of 116 South Tyrolean municipalities, 103 have a German-speaking, eight a Ladin-speaking, and five an Italian-speaking majority.
There was large-scale immigration of Italians from the rest of Italy to Bolzano and its surroundings after 1918.

The province is granted a considerable level of self-government, consisting of a large range of exclusive legislative and executive powers and a fiscal regime that allows it to retain 90% of revenue, while remaining a net contributor to the national budget. As of 2016, South Tyrol is the wealthiest province in Italy and among the wealthiest in the European Union.

In the wider context of the European Union, the province is one of the three members of the Tyrol–South Tyrol–Trentino Euroregion, which corresponds almost exactly to the historical region of Tyrol. The other members are Tyrol state in Austria, to the north and east, and the Italian Autonomous Province of Trento to the south.

Name 

South Tyrol (occasionally South Tirol) is the term most commonly used in English for the province, and its usage reflects that it was created from a portion of the southern part of the historic County of Tyrol, a former state of the Holy Roman Empire and crown land of the Austrian Empire of the Habsburgs. German and Ladin speakers usually refer to the area as Südtirol; the Italian equivalent Sudtirolo (sometimes parsed Sud Tirolo) is becoming increasingly common.

Alto Adige (literally translated in English: "Upper Adige"), one of the Italian names for the province, is also used in English. The term had been the name of political subdivisions along the Adige River in the time of Napoleon Bonaparte, who created the Department of Alto Adige, part of the Napoleonic Kingdom of Italy. It was reused as the Italian name of the current province after its post-World War I creation, and was a symbol of the subsequent forced Italianization of South Tyrol.

The official name of the province today in German is Autonome Provinz Bozen — Südtirol. German speakers usually refer to it not as a Provinz, but as a Land (like the Länder of Germany and Austria). Provincial institutions are referred to using the prefix Landes-, such as Landesregierung (state government) and Landeshauptmann (governor).
The official name in Italian is Provincia autonoma di Bolzano — Alto Adige, in Ladin Provinzia autonoma de Balsan/Bulsan — Südtirol.

History

Annexation by Italy 
South Tyrol is an administrative entity originated during the First World War. The Allies promised the area to Italy in the Treaty of London of 1915 as an incentive to enter the war on their side. Until 1918, it was part of the Austro-Hungarian princely County of Tyrol, but this almost completely German-speaking territory was occupied by Italy at the end of the war in November 1918 and was annexed to the Kingdom of Italy in 1919. The province as it exists today was created in 1926 after an administrative reorganization of the Kingdom of Italy, and was incorporated together with the province of Trento into the newly created region of Venezia Tridentina ("Trentine Venetia").

With the rise of Italian Fascism, the new regime made efforts to bring forward the Italianization of South Tyrol. The German language was banished from public service, German teaching was officially forbidden, and German newspapers were censored (with the exception of the fascistic Alpenzeitung). The regime also favoured immigration from other Italian regions.

The subsequent alliance between Adolf Hitler and Benito Mussolini declared that South Tyrol would not follow the destiny of Austria, which had been annexed by Nazi Germany. Instead the dictators agreed that the German-speaking population be transferred to German-ruled territory or dispersed around Italy, but the outbreak of the Second World War prevented them from fully carrying out their plans. Every citizen was given the choice to give up their German cultural identity and stay in fascist Italy, or to leave their homeland for Nazi Germany to retain their cultural identity. This resulted in the division of South Tyrolese families.

In this tense relationship for the population, Walter Caldonazzi from Mals was part of the resistance group around the priest Heinrich Maier, which passed plans and information about production facilities for V-1 rockets, V-2 rockets, Tiger tanks, Messerschmitt Bf 109, and Messerschmitt Me 163 Komet and other aircraft to the Allies. The group planned for an independent Austria with a monarchical form of government after the war, which would include Austria, Bavaria and South Tyrol.

In 1943, when the Italian government signed an armistice with the Allies, the region was occupied by Nazi Germany, which reorganised it as the Operation Zone of the Alpine Foothills and put it under the administration of Gauleiter Franz Hofer. The region was de facto annexed to the German Reich (with the addition of the province of Belluno) until the end of the war. Italian rule was restored in 1945 as the Nazi regime ended.

Gruber–De Gasperi Agreement 

After the war, the Allies decided that the province would remain a part of Italy, under the condition that the German-speaking population be granted a significant level of self-government. Italy and Austria negotiated an agreement in 1946, recognizing the rights of the German minority. Alcide De Gasperi, Italy's prime minister, a native of Trentino, wanted to extend the autonomy to his fellow citizens. This led to the creation of the region called Trentino-Alto Adige/Tiroler Etschland. The Gruber–De Gasperi Agreement of September 1946 was signed by the Italian and Austrian Foreign Ministers, creating the autonomous region of Trentino-South Tyrol, consisting of the autonomous provinces of Trentino and South Tyrol. German and Italian were both made official languages, and German-language education was permitted once more. Still Italians were the majority in the combined region.

This, together with the arrival of new Italian-speaking immigrants, led to strong dissatisfaction among South Tyrolese, which culminated in terrorist acts perpetrated by the Befreiungsausschuss Südtirol (BAS – Liberation Committee of South Tyrol). In the first phase, only public edifices and fascist monuments were targeted. The second phase was bloodier, costing 21 lives (15 members of Italian security forces, two civilians, and four terrorists).

Südtirolfrage 

The South Tyrolean Question (Südtirolfrage) became an international issue. As the implementation of the post-war agreement was deemed unsatisfactory by the Austrian government, it became a cause of significant friction with Italy and was taken up by the United Nations in 1960. A fresh round of negotiations took place in 1961 but proved unsuccessful, partly because of the campaign of terrorism.

The issue was resolved in 1971, when a new Austro-Italian treaty was signed and ratified. It stipulated that disputes in South Tyrol would be submitted for settlement to the International Court of Justice in The Hague, that the province would receive greater autonomy within Italy, and that Austria would not interfere in South Tyrol's internal affairs. The new agreement proved broadly satisfactory to the parties involved, and the separatist tensions soon eased.

The autonomous status granted in 1972 has resulted in a considerable level of self-government, and also allows the entity to retain almost 90% of all levied taxes.

Autonomy 

In 1992, Italy and Austria officially ended their dispute over the autonomy issue on the basis of the agreement of 1972.

The extensive self-government provided by the current institutional framework has been advanced as a model for settling interethnic disputes and for the successful protection of linguistic minorities. This is among the reasons why the Ladin municipalities of Cortina d'Ampezzo/Anpezo, Livinallongo del Col di Lana/Fodom and Colle Santa Lucia/Col have asked in a referendum to be detached from Veneto and reannexed to the province, from which they were separated under the fascist government.

Euroregion 

In 1996, the Euroregion Tyrol-South Tyrol-Trentino was formed between the Austrian state of Tyrol and the Italian provinces of South Tyrol and Trentino. The boundaries of the association correspond to the old County of Tyrol. The aim is to promote regional peace, understanding and cooperation in many areas. The region's assemblies meet together as one on various occasions, and have set up a common liaison office with the European Union in Brussels.

Geography 

South Tyrol is located at the northernmost point in Italy. The province is bordered by Austria to the east and north, specifically by the Austrian federal-states Tyrol and Salzburg, and by the Swiss canton of Graubünden to the west. The Italian provinces of Belluno, Trentino, and Sondrio border to the southeast, south, and southwest, respectively.

The landscape itself is mostly cultivated with different types of shrubs and forests and is highly mountainous.

Entirely located in the Alps, the province's landscape is dominated by mountains. The highest peak is the Ortler in the far west, which is also the highest peak in the Eastern Alps outside the Bernina Range. Even more famous are the craggy peaks of the Dolomites in the eastern part of the region.

The following mountain groups are (partially) in South Tyrol. All but the Sarntal Alps are on the border with Austria, Switzerland, or other Italian provinces. The ranges are clockwise from the west and for each the highest peak is given that is within the province or on its border.

Located between the mountains are many valleys, where the majority of the population lives.

Administrative divisions 

The province is divided into eight districts (German: Bezirksgemeinschaften,), one of them being the chief city of Bolzano. Each district is headed by a president and two bodies called the district committee and the district council. The districts are responsible for resolving intermunicipal disputes and providing roads, schools, and social services such as retirement homes.

The province is further divided into 116 Gemeinden or comuni.

Districts

Largest municipalities

Climate 

Climatically, South Tyrol may be divided into five distinct groups:

The Adige valley area, with cold winters (24-hour averages in January of about ) and warm summers (24-hour averages in July of about ), usually classified as humid subtropical climate — Cfa. It has the driest and sunniest climate of the province. The main city in this area is Bolzano.

This is a typical oceanic climate, classified as Cfb. It is usually wetter than the subtropical climate, and very snowy during the winters. During the spring and autumn, there is an extended foggy season, but fog may occur even on summer mornings. Main towns in this area are Meran, Bruneck, Sterzing, and Brixen. Near the lakes in higher lands (between ) the humidity may make the climate in these regions milder during winter, but also cooler in summer, making it more similar to a subpolar oceanic climate, Cfc.

It is a very snowy climate; snow may occur from early October to April or even May. Main municipalities in this area are Urtijëi, Badia, Sexten, Toblach, Stilfs, Vöran, and Mühlwald.

These areas usually have five months below the freezing point, and snow sometimes occurs even during the summer, in September. This climate is the wettest of the province, with large rainfalls during the summer, heavy snowfalls during spring and fall. The winter is usually a little drier, marked by freezing and dry weeks, although not sufficiently dry to be classified as a Dwc climate. Main municipalities in this area are Corvara, Sëlva, Santa Cristina Gherdëina.

The highlands above , with an alpine tundra climate, ET, which becomes an ice cap climate, EF, above . The winters are cold, but sometimes not as cold as the higher valleys' winters. The higher lands, above  are usually extremely cold, with averages of about  during the coldest month, January.

Geology 
The periadriatic seam, which separates the Southern Alps from the Central Alps, runs through South Tyrol in a southwest-northeast direction. In South Tyrol at least three of the four main structural elements of the Alps come to light: the Southern Alpine comes to light south of the periadriatic suture, the Eastern Alpine north of it, and in the northern part of the country, east of the Brenner Pass, the Tauern window, in which the Peninsular and, according to some authors, the Helvetic are visible.

In South Tyrol, the following structure can be roughly recognized: The lowest floor forms the crystalline basement. About 280 million years ago, in the Lower Permian, multiple magmatic events occurred. At that time the Brixen granite was formed at the northern boundary of the Southern Alps, and at about the same time, further south in the Bolzano area, there was strong volcanic activity that formed the Adige Valley volcanic complex. In the Upper Permian a period began in which sedimentary rocks were formed. At first, these were partly clastic sediments, among which the Gröden sandstone is found. In the Triassic, massive carbonate platforms of dolomitic rocks then formed; this process was interrupted in the Middle Triassic by a brief but violent phase of volcanic activity.

In South Tyrol, the Eastern Alps consist mainly of metamorphic rocks, such as gneisses or mica schists, with occasional intercalations of marble and Mesozoic sedimentary rocks with metamorphic overprint (e.g., in the Ortler or southwest of the Brenner). Various metamorphic rocks are found in the Tauern Window, such as Hochstegen marble (as in Wolfendorn), Grünschiefer (as in Hochfeiler), or rocks of the Zentralgneiss (predominantly in the area of the Zillertal Main Ridge).

The province of South Tyrol has placed numerous geological natural monuments under protection.

Mountains 

According to the Alpine Association, South Tyrol is home to 13 mountain groups of the Eastern Alps, of which only the Sarntal Alps are entirely within national borders. The remaining twelve are (clockwise, starting from the west): Sesvenna Group, Ötztal Alps, Stubai Alps, Zillertal Alps, Venediger Group, Rieserferner Group, Villgratner Mountains, Carnic Alps, Dolomites, Fleimstal Alps, Nonsberg Group and Ortler Alps. Of particular note are the Dolomites, parts of which were recognized by UNESCO in 2009 as a "Dolomite World Heritage Site".

Among the multitude of peaks, the Dolomites are the highest in the Alps. Among the large number of peaks, three stand out for their alpine or cultural importance: the Ortler as the highest mountain in South Tyrol, the Schlern as the country's "landmark" and the Drei Zinnen as the center of alpine climbing. Other well-known mountains are the Königspitze, the Weißkugel, the Similaun, the Hochwilde, the Sarner Weißhorn, the Hochfeiler, the Dreiherrnspitze, the Hochgall, the Peitlerkofel, the Langkofel and the Rosengartenspitze.

Along the main valleys, the mountain ranges descend in many places to valley bottoms over gently terraced landscapes, which are geological remains of former valley systems; situated between inhospitable high mountains and formerly boggy or deeply incised valley bottoms, these areas known as the "Mittelgebirge" (including, for example, the Schlern area) are of particular importance in terms of settlement history.

Valleys 

The three main valleys of South Tyrol are the Adige Valley, the Eisack Valley and the Puster Valley, formed by the Ice Age Adige glacier and its tributaries. The highest part of the Adige valley in western South Tyrol, from Reschen to Töll (approx. ) near Merano, is called Vinschgau; the southernmost section, from Bolzano to Salurner Klause, is divided into Überetsch and Unterland. From there, the Adige Valley continues in a southerly direction until it merges with the Po plain at Verona.

At Bolzano, the Eisack Valley merges into the Adige Valley. The Eisack Valley runs from Bolzano northeastward to Franzensfeste, where it merges with the Wipp Valley, which runs first northwestward and then northward over the Brenner Pass to Innsbruck. In the town of Brixen, the Eisack Valley meets the Puster Valley, which passes through Bruneck and reaches Lienz via the Toblacher Sattel. In addition to the three main valleys, South Tyrol has a large number of side valleys. The most important and populated side valleys are (from west to east) Sulden, Schnals, Ulten, Passeier, Ridnaun, the Sarntal, Pfitsch, Gröden, the Gadertal, the Tauferer Ahrntal and Antholz.

The most densely populated areas are in the Adige valley, where three of the four largest cities, Bolzano, Merano and Laives, are located. The flat valley bottoms are mainly used for agriculture.

Hydrography 

They are fed by numerous rivers and streams in the tributary valleys. The most important tributaries are the Plima, the Passer, the Falschauer, the Talfer, the Ahr and the Gader. The remaining 3% of the area is drained by the Drava and Inn river systems to the Black Sea and by the Piave river system to the Adriatic Sea, respectively.

In South Tyrol there are 176 natural lakes with an area of more than half a hectare (1¼ acre), most of which are located above  altitude. Only 13 natural lakes are larger than 5 ha, and only three of them are situated below  altitude: the Kalterer See, the Großer and the Kleiner Montiggler See. Fourteen South Tyrolean reservoirs used for energy production include the Reschensee, which with an area of  forms the largest standing body of water in South Tyrol, the Zufrittsee and the Arzkarsee.

The natural monuments designated by the province of South Tyrol include numerous hydrological objects, such as streams, waterfalls, moors, glaciers and mountain lakes like the Pragser Wildsee, the Karersee or the Spronser Seen.

Vegetation 

Approximately 24% of the forest area can be classified as protective forest preserving settlements, traffic routes and other human infrastructure. A 1997 study classified about 35% of South Tyrol's forests as near-natural or natural, about 41% as moderately modified and about 24% as heavily modified or artificial. The forests are found in the valley bottoms.

The flat valley bottoms were originally completely covered with riparian forests, of which only very small remnants remain along the rivers. The remaining areas have given way to settlements and agricultural land. On the valley slopes, sub-Mediterranean mixed deciduous forests are found up to  altitude, characterized mainly by manna ash, hop hornbeam, hackberry, sweet chestnut and downy oak. The latter are often mixed with tree species such as larch, rowan, white pine and stone pine. The larch and stone pine forests at the upper edge of the forest belt occupy relatively small areas. Beyond the forest edge, subalpine dwarf shrub communities, alpine grasslands and, lately, alpine tundra dominate the landscape as vegetation types.

Politics 

The local government system is based upon the provisions of the Italian Constitution and the Autonomy Statute of the Region Trentino-Alto Adige/Südtirol. The 1972 second Statute of Autonomy for Trentino-Alto Adige/Südtirol devolved most legislative and executive competences from the regional level to the provincial level, creating de facto two separate regions.

The considerable legislative power of the province is vested in an assembly, the Landtag of South Tyrol (German: Südtiroler Landtag; Italian: Consiglio della Provincia Autonoma di Bolzano; Ladin: Cunsëi dla Provinzia Autonoma de Bulsan).
The legislative powers of the assembly are defined by the second Statute of Autonomy.

The executive powers are attributed to the government (German: Landesregierung; Italian: Giunta Provinciale) headed by the Landeshauptmann Arno Kompatscher. He belongs to the South Tyrolean People's Party, which has been governing with a parliamentary majority since 1948. South Tyrol is characterized by long sitting presidents, having only had two presidents between 1960 and 2014 (Silvius Magnago 1960–1989, Luis Durnwalder 1989–2014).

A fiscal regime allows the province to retain a large part of most levied taxes, in order to execute and administer its competences. Nevertheless, South Tyrol remains a net contributor to the Italian national budget.

Last provincial elections

List of governors

Provincial Government 

The provincial government (Landesregierung) of South Tyrol (formerly also called provincial committee, Giunta provinciale in Italian, Junta provinziala in Ladin) consists of a provincial governor and a variable number of provincial councilors. Currently (2021), the provincial government consists of eight provincial councilors and the provincial governor. The deputies of the provincial governor are appointed from among the provincial councilors. The current governor is Arno Kompatscher (SVP), his deputies are the provincial councilors Arnold Schuler (SVP), Giuliano Vettorato (LN) and Daniel Alfreider (SVP).

The Governor and the Provincial Councilors are elected by Parliament by secret ballot with an absolute majority of votes. The composition of the provincial government must in any case reflect the proportional distribution of the German and Italian language groups in the provincial parliament. In the past, this provision prevented the German-dominated South Tyrol People's Party (SVP) from governing alone and allowed Italian parties to participate in the provincial government. Since the Ladin language group, with just under 4% of South Tyrol's resident population, has little electoral potential, a separate provision in the autonomy statute allows Ladin representation in the provincial government regardless of their proportional representation in the provincial parliament.

Secessionist movement 

Given the region's historical and cultural association with neighboring Austria, calls for the secession of South Tyrol and its reunification with Austria do surface from time to time among some minor groups of German-speakers , although falling short of an majority in the province , the majority does not support a separation. Among the political parties that support South Tyrol's reunification into Austria are South Tyrolean Freedom, Die Freiheitlichen and Citizens' Union for South Tyrol.

Economy
 
In 2016 South Tyrol had a GDP per capita of €42,600, making it the richest province in Italy and one of the richest in the European Union.

The unemployment level in 2007 was roughly 2.4% (2.0% for men and 3.0% for women). Residents are employed in a variety of sectors, from agriculture — the province is a large producer of apples, and its South Tyrol wine are also renowned — to industry to services, especially tourism. Spas located on the Italian Alps have become a favorite for tourists seeking wellness.

South Tyrol is home to numerous mechanical engineering companies, some of which are the global market leaders in their sectors: the Leitner Group that specializes in cable cars and wind energy, TechnoAlpin AG, which is the global market leader in snow-making technology and the snow groomer company Prinoth.

The unemployment rate stood at 3.8% in 2020.

Transport

The region is, together with northern and eastern Tyrol, an important transit point between southern Germany and Northern Italy. Freights by road and rail pass through here. One of the most important highways is the A22, also called the Autostrada del Brennero. It connects to the Brenner Autobahn in Austria.

The vehicle registration plate of South Tyrol is the two-letter provincial code Bz for the capital city, Bolzano. Along with the autonomous Trentino (Tn) and Aosta Valley (Ao), South Tyrol is allowed to surmount its license plates with its coat of arms.

Rail transport goes over the Brenner Pass. The Brenner Railway is a major line connecting the Austrian and Italian railways from Innsbruck and Verona climbing the Wipptal, passing over the Brenner Pass and descending down the Eisack Valley to Bolzano and then down the Adige Valley from Bolzano to Rovereto and to Verona. The line is part of the Line 1 of Trans-European Transport Networks (TEN-T).

Other railways are the Pustertalbahn, Ritten Railway and Vinschgaubahn. Due to the steep slopes of the mountains, a number of funiculars exist, such as the Gardena Ronda Express funicular and Mendel Funicular.

The Brenner Base Tunnel is under construction and scheduled to be completed by 2025.

Larger cities used to have their own tramway system, such as the Meran Tramway and Bolzano Tramway. These were replaced after the Second World War with buses. Many other cities and municipalities have their own bus system or are connected with each other by it.

The Bolzano Airport is the only airport serving the region.

Demographics

Languages 

German and Italian are both official languages of South Tyrol. In some eastern municipalities Ladin is the third official language. 

A majority of the inhabitants of contemporary South Tyrol speak native Austro-Bavarian dialects of the German language. Standard German plays a dominant role in education and media. All citizens have the right to use their own mother tongue, even at court. Schools are separated for each language group. All traffic signs are officially bi- or trilingual. Most Italian place names were translated from German by Italian Ettore Tolomei, the author of the Prontuario dei nomi locali dell'Alto Adige.

To reach a fair allocation of jobs in public service a system called ethnic proportion has been established. Every ten years, when the general census of population takes place, each citizen has to declare the linguistic group to which they belong or want to be aggregated to. According to the results they decide how many people of which group are going to be employed in public service.

At the time of the annexation of the southern part of Tyrol by Italy in 1919, the overwhelming majority of the population spoke German and identified with the Austrian or German nationality: in 1910, according to the last population census before World War I, the German-speaking population numbered 224,000, the Ladin 9,000 and the Italian 7,000.

As a result of the Italianization of South Tyrol about 23% of the population are Italian-speakers (they were 33%, 138,000 of 414,000 inhabitants in the 1971 census) according to the census of 2011. 103 out of 116 comuni have a majority of German native speakers — with Martell reaching 100% — eight have a Ladin-speaking majority, and five a majority of Italian speakers. The Italian-speaking population lives mainly around the provincial capital Bolzano, where they are the majority (73.8% of the inhabitants), and partially a result of Benito Mussolini's policy of Italianisation after he took power in 1922, when he encouraged immigration from the rest of Italy. 

The other four comuni where the Italian-speaking population is the majority are Laives, Salorno, Bronzolo and Vadena. The eight comuni with Ladin majorities are: La Val, Badia, Corvara, Mareo, San Martin de Tor, Santa Cristina Gherdëina, Sëlva, Urtijëi. Most of the immigrants from South Tyrol to the United States identify themselves as being of German rather than Austrian identity. According to the United States Census Bureau, in 2015, there were 365 individuals living in the U.S. born in Italy who identified themselves as being of Austrian ancestry. By contrast, in the same year, there were 1040 individuals living in the U.S. born in Italy who identified themselves as being of German ancestry. 

The linguistic breakdown according to the census of 2011:

Religion 
The majority of the population is Christian, mostly in the Catholic tradition. The Roman Catholic Diocese of Bolzano-Brixen corresponds to the territory of the province of South Tyrol. Since July 27, 2011 the bishop of Bolzano-Brixen is Ivo Muser.

Catholic Church 

The vast majority of the population of South Tyrol is baptized Catholic. There is archaeological evidence of early Christian sites in the area as early as Late Antiquity; Säben in the Eisack Valley became an important ecclesiastical center during this period, which was only replaced by Brixen as an episcopal see in the late Middle Ages. The territory of present-day South Tyrol was divided for centuries between the dioceses of Brixen, Chur (until 1808/1816) and Trent (until 1964). 

The most famous bishop of Brixen was the polymath Nicholas of Cusa. Important figures of the regional ecclesiastical life in the 19th century were the beatified bishop of Trent Johann Nepomuk von Tschiderer and the mystic Maria von Mörl. 

In 1964, with reference to modern political boundaries, the Bishopric of Brixen, which had lost its extensive territories of North and East Tyrol after World War I, was enlarged to form the Diocese of Bolzano-Brixen, whose extension is now identical to that of the province of South Tyrol. Since then, the faithful have been led by Bishops Joseph Gargitter (1964-1986), Wilhelm Egger (1986-2008), Karl Golser (2008-2011) and Ivo Muser (since 2011). The diocese comprises 28 deaneries and 281 parishes (in 2014), 23 its episcopal churches are the Cathedral of Brixen and the Cathedral of Bolzano. Cassian and Vigilius are venerated as diocesan patrons. Important references in the current discourses of the local Catholic Church are St. Joseph Freinademetz and Blessed Joseph Mayr-Nusser.

Other communities 
There is a Lutheran community in Merano (founded 1861) and another one in Bolzano (founded 1889). Since the Middle Ages the Jewish presence has been documented in South Tyrol. In 1901 the Synagogue of Merano was built. As of 2015, South Tyrol was home to about 14,000 Muslims.

Culture

Traditions 
South Tyrol has long-standing traditions, mainly inherited from its membership in the historical Tyrol. The Schützen associations are particularly fond of Tyrolean traditions.

The Scheibenschlagen are the traditional "throwing of burning discs" on the first Sunday of Lent, the Herz-Jesu-Feuer are the "fires of the Sacred Heart of Jesus" that are lit on the third Sunday after Pentecost. The Krampus are disguised demons who accompany St Nicholas.

There are also several legends and sagas linked to the peoples of the Dolomites; among the best known are the legend of King Laurin and that of the Kingdom of Fanes, which belongs to the Ladin mythological heritage.

Alpine Transhumance (from German "Almabtrieb"), is a farm practice: every year, between September and October, the livestock that stayed on the high pastures is brought back to the valley, with traditional music and dances. Especially, the transhumance between the Ötztal (in Austria) and Schnals Valley and Passeier Valley was recognised by UNESCO as universal intangible heritage in 2019.

Education

Architecture 

The region features a large number of castles and churches. Many of the castles and Ansitze were built by the local nobility and the Habsburg rulers. See List of castles in South Tyrol.

Museums
Among the major museums of South Tyrol are:
 the South Tyrol Museum of Archaeology, which has the mummy of Ötzi the Iceman
 the Museion, Museum of modern and contemporary art of Bolzano
 the Messner Mountain Museum of Reinhold Messner
 the White Tower (Brixen) museum

Media 
German-language TV channels in South Tyrol:
  RAS
 Rai Südtirol
 Südtirol Digital Fernsehen
 Südtirol Heute

Music 
The Bozner Bergsteigerlied and the Andreas-Hofer-Lied are considered to be the unofficial anthems of South Tyrol.

The folk musical group Kastelruther Spatzen from Kastelruth and the rock band Frei.Wild from Brixen have received high recognition in the German-speaking part of the world.

Award-winning electronic music producer Giorgio Moroder was born and raised in South Tyrol in a mixed Italian, German and Ladin-speaking environment.

Sports 
South Tyrolese have been successful at winter sports and they regularly form a large part of Italy's contingent at the Winter Olympics. Famed mountain climber Reinhold Messner, the first climber to climb Mount Everest without the use of oxygen tanks, was born and raised in the region. Other successful South Tyrolese include luger Armin Zöggeler, figure skater Carolina Kostner, skier Isolde Kostner, luge and bobsleigh medallist Gerda Weissensteiner, tennis players Andreas Seppi and Jannik Sinner, and team principal of Haas F1 Team in the FIA Formula One World Championship Guenther Steiner.

HC Interspar Bolzano-Bozen Foxes are one of Italy's most successful ice hockey teams, while the most important football club in South Tyrol is F.C. Südtirol, which won its first-ever promotion to Serie B in 2022.

The province is famous worldwide for its mountain climbing opportunities, while in winter it is home to a number of popular ski resorts including Val Gardena, Alta Badia and Seiser Alm.

See also
 History of South Tyrol
 Tyrol
 Tyrol–South Tyrol–Trentino Euroregion

References

Bibliography
  Gottfried Solderer (ed) (1999–2004). Das 20. Jahrhundert in Südtirol. 6 Vol., Bozen: Raetia Verlag. 
 Antony E. Alcock (2003). The History of the South Tyrol Question. London: Michael Joseph. 535 pp.
 Rolf Steininger (2003). South Tyrol: A Minority Conflict of the Twentieth Century. New Brunswick, New Jersey: Transaction Publishers. 
 Georg Grote (2012). The South Tyrol Question 1866–2010. From National Rage to Regional State. Oxford: Peter Lang. 
 Georg Grote, Hannes Obermair (2017). A Land on the Threshold. South Tyrolean Transformations, 1915–2015. Oxford/Bern/New York: Peter Lang.

External links

 Official website for the Civic Network of South Tyrol, the Autonomous Province of Bolzano/Bozen
 Special Statute for Trentino-Alto Adige/Südtirol
 Tourist information about South Tyrol
 The most accurate digital map of South Tyrol

 
Regions of Europe with multiple official languages
Autonomous provinces
German-speaking countries and territories
Provinces of Italy

Articles containing video clips